Alexandru Boiciuc (born 21 August 1997) is a Moldovan professional footballer who plays as a forward for Liga II side Gloria Buzău.

Career

Politehnica Iași
Alexandru Boiciuc made his professional debut at age of 18 in a league match against Viitorul Constanța. He came on for Bojan Golubovic in the 90th minute. He scored his first career goal against Pandurii as his team lost 5–2 in a league match.

Vejle Boldklub
Boiciuc signed for Danish club Vejle Boldklub in January 2018.

On 4 July 2018, after only making 3 appearances for Vejle, Boiciuc went on loan to Moldovan club Sheriff Tiraspol.

Italy
On 25 February 2021, he joined Italian third-tier club Turris.

Career statistics

Honours
Sheriff Tiraspol
Moldovan National Division: 2018

References

External links

1997 births
Living people
Moldovan footballers
Moldova youth international footballers
Moldova under-21 international footballers
Moldova international footballers
Association football forwards
FC Politehnica Iași (2010) players
ACS Foresta Suceava players
FC Milsami Orhei players
ASA 2013 Târgu Mureș players
Vejle Boldklub players
FC Sheriff Tiraspol players
FC Sfîntul Gheorghe players
FC Karpaty Lviv players
LPS HD Clinceni players
FC Universitatea Cluj players
FC Gloria Buzău players
Liga I players
Liga II players
Moldovan Super Liga players
Danish 1st Division players
Ukrainian Premier League players
Serie C players
S.S. Turris Calcio players
Footballers from Chișinău
Moldovan expatriate footballers
Expatriate footballers in Romania
Moldovan expatriate sportspeople in Romania
Expatriate men's footballers in Denmark
Moldovan expatriate sportspeople in Denmark
Expatriate footballers in Ukraine
Moldovan expatriate sportspeople in Ukraine
Expatriate footballers in Italy
Moldovan expatriate sportspeople in Italy